The 2021 MUSC Health Women's Open was a tournament on the 2021 WTA Tour. It was played on outdoor green clay courts in Charleston, South Carolina, United States. It was organised with a single-year licence in 2021, held at Family Circle Tennis Center from April 12 to 18, 2021.

Champions

Singles

  Astra Sharma def.  Ons Jabeur, 2–6, 7–5, 6–1

Doubles

  Hailey Baptiste /  Caty McNally def.  Ellen Perez /  Storm Sanders, 6–7(4–7), 6–4, [10–6]

Singles main-draw entrants

Seeds

1 Rankings are as of April 5, 2021

Other entrants
The following players received wildcards into the main draw:
  Linda Fruhvirtová
  Emma Navarro
  CoCo Vandeweghe

The following player received entry as a special exempt:
  María Camila Osorio Serrano

The following players received entry from the qualifying draw:
  Claire Liu
  Grace Min
  Alycia Parks
  Storm Sanders

Withdrawals
Before the tournament
  Amanda Anisimova → replaced by  Caty McNally
  Irina-Camelia Begu → replaced by  Wang Yafan
  Anna Blinkova → replaced by  Liudmila Samsonova
  Danielle Collins → replaced by  Francesca Di Lorenzo
  Coco Gauff → replaced by  Viktoriya Tomova
  Madison Keys → replaced by  Sara Errani
  Barbora Krejčíková → replaced by  Tereza Martincová
  Ann Li → replaced by  Danka Kovinić
  Jessica Pegula → replaced by  Clara Tauson
  Rebecca Peterson → replaced by  Christina McHale
  Yulia Putintseva → replaced by  Renata Zarazúa
  Anastasia Potapova → replaced by  Stefanie Vögele
  Laura Siegemund → replaced by  Kristie Ahn
  Sloane Stephens → replaced by  Natalia Vikhlyantseva

Retirements
  Alizé Cornet
  Misaki Doi
  Tereza Martincová

Doubles main-draw entrants

Seeds

 Rankings are as of April 5, 2021.

Other entrants
The following pair received a wildcard into the doubles main draw:
  Sophie Chang /  Emma Navarro

The following pair received entry into the doubles main draw using a protected ranking:
  Oksana Kalashnikova /  Alla Kudryavtseva

The following pair received entry into the doubles main draw as an alternate:
  Linda Fruhvirtová /  Tereza Martincová

Withdrawals 
Before the tournament
  Anna Blinkova /  Lucie Hradecká → replaced by  Elixane Lechemia /  Ingrid Neel
  Misaki Doi /  Nao Hibino → replaced by  Linda Fruhvirtová /  Tereza Martincová
  Coco Gauff /  Caty McNally → replaced by  Beatrice Gumulya /  Jessy Rompies
  Makoto Ninomiya /  Yang Zhaoxuan → replaced by  Jamie Loeb /  Erin Routliffe
During the tournament
  Linda Fruhvirtová /  Tereza Martincová

Retirements 
  Arina Rodionova /  Rosalie van der Hoek

References

External links
 ITF tournament details

2021 MUSC Health Women's Open
2021 WTA Tour
2021 in American tennis
2021 in sports in South Carolina
April 2021 sports events in the United States
Tennis tournaments in South Carolina